Municipal elections were held in Finland on 13 June 2021 after being rescheduled from 18 April due to the COVID-19 pandemic.

Context 
The last municipal elections were held in 2017 and were won by the National Coalition Party with a 20.7 percent share of the votes.

Opinion polls
Poll results are listed in the table below in reverse chronological order, showing the most recent first. The highest percentage figure in each poll is displayed in bold, and the background shaded in the leading party's colour. In the instance that there is a tie, then no figure is shaded. The table uses the date the survey's fieldwork was done, as opposed to the date of publication. However, if that date is unknown, the date of publication will be given instead. List includes only polls that were made for the municipal election.

Helsinki  polls

Election schedule 

Source:

Results

Most parties, such as the Social Democratic Party, Centre Party, Green League, and the Left Alliance showed a decline in their vote share and council seats. The National Coalition Party had a small increase, while the biggest winner was the Finns Party, who saw major increase in vote share and council seats. The 14,5% they received is the highest vote share in municipal elections since the party's foundation. The party is now the largest group on at least six councils: in Hamina, Orimattila, Kihniö, Ylöjärvi, Kankaanpää and Hämeenkyrö.

Source: Yle

References

Finland
April 2021 events in Finland
Municipal elections in Finland
Elections postponed due to the COVID-19 pandemic